The Taman Selatan LRT station is a light rapid transit (LRT) station that serves the suburb of Klang in Selangor, Malaysia. It is as one of the stations on the Shah Alam line. The station is an elevated rapid transit station in Taman Selatan, Klang, Selangor, Malaysia, forming part of the Klang Valley Integrated Transit System.

The station is marked as Station No. 21 along the RM9 billion line project with the line's maintenance depot located in Johan Setia, Klang. The Taman Selatan LRT station is expected to be operational in February 2024 and will have facilities such as kiosks, restrooms, elevators, taxi stand and feeder bus among others.

Locality landmarks
 Taman Selatan Klang
 Southern Park commercial center
 Sekolah Khas Klang
 Kolej Komuniti Klang
 Euro Hotel
 SMK Tengku Ampuan Rahimah Klang (STAR)
 Hin Hua High School
 SK (1) & (2) Simpang Lima, Klang
 Regent International School Klang
 Taman Palm Grove
 Taman Chi Lieung

References

External links
 LRT3 Bandar Utama–Klang line

Rapid transit stations in Selangor
Shah Alam Line